Decoding the Past (2005–2008) is a History Channel paranormal television series that "decodes" the past by looking for unusual, and mysterious things written throughout history that may give clues as to what will happen in the future.

Episodes

Season 1

Season 2

Season 3

Season 4

References

External links
 A&E Store – Decoding the Past
 IMDb – Decoding the Past
 TV.com – Decoding the Past
 TV Guide – Decoding the Past
 Official discussion forum on The History Channel's website

History (American TV channel) original programming
Conspiracy
Paranormal television